Second Harbour Crossing may refer to:

 Second Harbour Crossing, Auckland, the proposed second transport link over the Waitemata Harbour in Auckland, New Zealand.
 Upper Harbour Bridge, an existing twin motorway bridge over the Waitemata Harbour in Auckland, New Zealand.
 The Twin Sails Bridge, a proposed double-leaved bascule bridge in Poole, Dorset, England.
 The Sydney Harbour Tunnel, an existing twin-tube road tunnel crossing of Sydney Harbour in New South Wales, Australia.
 A proposed extension of the Westconnex motorway over the Sydney Harbour in New South Wales, Australia.
 Sydney Metro City & Southwest, a metro rail line under construction beneath Sydney Harbour in New South Wales, Australia.
 Eastern Harbour Crossing, an existing twin-tube road tunnel crossing of Victoria Harbour in Hong Kong.